The Canton of Cherbourg-Octeville-Sud-Ouest in France was situated in the department of Manche and the region of Basse-Normandie. It had 19,161 inhabitants (2012). It was disbanded following the French canton reorganisation which came into effect in March 2015. Cherbourg-Octeville was its seat.

The canton comprised the following communes:
Cherbourg-Octeville (partly)
Couville
Hardinvast
Martinvast
Saint-Martin-le-Gréard
Tollevast

References

Cherbourg-Octeville-Sud-Ouest
Cherbourg-Octeville
2015 disestablishments in France
States and territories disestablished in 2015